Bly Getrou is the second studio album by the South African pop/opera vocal quartet Romanz.

Track listing
 "Bly Getrou Aan Jou Liefde"
 "Onthou Jy My"
 "As Jy Hier Verdwaal"
 "Neem My Op Vlerke"
 "Genade Onbeskryflik Groot"
 "Kom En Red My"
 "Ek Weet Dit Nou"
 "Angels"
 "Jy's Veilig By My"
 "Dis Weer Septembermaand"
 "Vandag Is Die Begin"
 "(Everything I Do) I Do It For You"
 "Kan Ek Jou Myne Maak"
 "Ek Is Lief Vir Jou"
 "My Hele Wereld Is Joune"
 "Here Lei My"
 "Dis Weer Kersfees"
 "South African National Anthem"

External links 
 Official Website

2009 albums
Romanz albums